Phillips Steere Paine (June 8, 1930 – February 19, 1978) was an American Major League Baseball relief pitcher who appeared in all or part of six MLB seasons between 1951 and 1958. In 1953, while serving in the military, Paine pitched in nine games for the Nishitetsu Lions, becoming the first major leaguer to play in Nippon Professional Baseball.

Paine was born in Chepachet, Rhode Island, and upon graduation from high school in nearby Burrillville, he signed with the Philadelphia Phillies in 1948. After two years in the Phillies' farm system, he was drafted by the Boston Braves.

Career in Japan and MLB
As a rookie, Paine won his only two decisions; he allowed 36 hits and 20 bases on balls in 35 innings pitched, but only 12 earned runs, for an ERA of 3.06.

He then entered the United States Army for military service during the Korean War. When his unit was sent to Japan, Paine was allowed to pitch for the Nishitetsu Lions, making his NPB debut on August 23, 1953. Unlike in the major leagues, Paine was a starting pitcher for the Lions, making eight starts among his nine appearances, and posting five complete games and one shutout. Overall, his NPB record was 4–3, with a 1.77 earned run average in 61 innings pitched.

In , Paine rejoined the Braves — now in Milwaukee — upon completion of his military service. He would continue his winning skein in a Brave uniform by posting a 3–0 record through . But his inconsistent performance resulted in assignments to the minor leagues for parts of four consecutive seasons. The 1958 campaign was Paine's only full year in the major leagues. He worked in a career-high 46 games, and won another four consecutive decisions (to go 9–0 for his career) before losing his first MLB game on July 29 against his original organization, the Phillies. As late as August 9, his earned run average was below the 2.00 mark. But two ineffective appearances over the season's final two months inflated Paine's ERA to 3.56. He was traded to the Los Angeles Dodgers during the off-season, played at the Triple-A level for three years, and never returned to the majors.

All told, in 95 MLB career games pitched, all in relief, Paine posted a 10–1 win–loss record (for a winning percentage of .909) with one save. In 150 total innings pitched he surrendered 144 hits and 80 bases on balls, with 101 strikeouts.

Personal life
Paine married Jeannette Orsini of Hummelstown, Pennsylvania, after meeting her while he was posted nearby during his U.S. Army basic training. They settled in Hummelstown to raise their family, with Paine helping to operate his in-laws' hotel and restaurant. On February 19, 1978, at age 47, he died from a brain tumor at the Veterans Hospital near Lebanon, Pennsylvania, and was survived by his wife and three children.

See also 
 American expatriate baseball players in Japan

References

External links

1930 births
1978 deaths
American expatriate baseball players in Japan
American military personnel of the Korean War
Atlanta Crackers players
Baseball players from Rhode Island
Beaumont Exporters players
Boston Braves players
Bradford Blue Wings players
Deaths from brain cancer in the United States
Deaths from cancer in Pennsylvania
Hartford Chiefs players
Major League Baseball pitchers
Milwaukee Braves players
Minneapolis Millers (baseball) players
Nishitetsu Lions players
People from Glocester, Rhode Island
People from Hummelstown, Pennsylvania
St. Louis Cardinals players
Spokane Indians players
Toledo Sox players
Toronto Maple Leafs (International League) players
Vancouver Mounties players
Vandergrift Pioneers players
Wichita Braves players